Dale Allan Scott (born August 14, 1959) is an American former umpire in Major League Baseball. He worked in the American League from 1986 to 1999, and officiated in both leagues from 2000 until his retirement after the 2017 season. He became a crew chief in 2001. He wore uniform number 39 his first two years and number 5 thereafter.

Umpiring career
Scott began umpiring at age 15 and entered the minor leagues in 1981, eventually working his way up to the Triple-A American Association. He umpired a single major league game during the 1985 MLB season, making his debut in an August 19 game between the Kansas City Royals and Detroit Tigers. Scott became a full-time MLB umpire in 1986, working 116 games that season. Scott worked a total of 3,897 regular season games, 91 post-season games, and issued 90 ejections in his MLB career.

Scott umpired in the World Series in 1998, 2001 and 2004, in the All-Star Game in 1993, 2001, and 2011, calling balls and strikes. He has also worked in six League Championship Series (1996, 1999, 2000, 2002, 2009, 2013) and in twelve Division Series (1995, 1997, 1998, 2001, 2003, 2004, 2005, 2007, 2008, 2011, 2014, 2015).

When the AL introduced red shirts in 1996, Scott frequently was the only umpire to wear the color, rather than the usual navy blue. He almost always wore the red shirt when working home plate, including Game 3 of the 1998 World Series at Qualcomm Stadium.

Scott worked his last game on April 14, 2017, in Toronto. In the 8th inning he was struck in the mask and was carted off the field with a concussion and whiplash. This was Scott's fourth concussion in five years, his second in nine months. After consulting with several sports medicine and concussion specialists, Scott decided not to return, and announced his retirement in December 2017.

Notable games
On May 30, 1988, Scott ejected New York Yankees manager Billy Martin from a game against the Oakland Athletics. Martin was suspended for three games for throwing dirt at Scott during the argument.

On July 1, 1990, Scott was the home plate umpire as Andy Hawkins of the New York Yankees pitched eight hitless innings in a road game against the Chicago White Sox, yet lost; it was, at the time, only the second game in history in which a pitcher lost a complete game no-hitter. In 1991 MLB revised the rules relating to official no-hit games, requiring that a pitcher must complete a minimum of 9 innings, and thereby voiding Hawkins' effort.

He was the home plate umpire on April 27, 1994, when Scott Erickson threw a no-hitter for the Twins vs the Brewers.

Scott was the first base umpire when Detroit Tigers pitcher Justin Verlander threw a no-hitter at Comerica Park against the Milwaukee Brewers on June 12, 2007. Five days prior to Verlander's no-hitter, Scott was also at first base in a game between the Boston Red Sox and the Oakland Athletics in which Boston pitcher Curt Schilling had a no-hitter until Shannon Stewart broke up the no-hitter with a single with two outs in the bottom of the ninth inning.

Scott worked his 3,000th career, regular season MLB game in St. Louis on his 50th birthday, August 14, 2009.

He was the third base umpire for Verlander's second no-hitter, thrown on May 7, 2011, against the Toronto Blue Jays.

Scott was the third base umpire when six Seattle Mariners pitchers combined to no-hit the Los Angeles Dodgers on June 8, 2012.

He was the second-most tenured umpire selected to officiate the 2014 Opening Series at the Sydney Cricket Ground in Sydney, Australia.

Personal life
Scott worked as a radio personality at KBDF, a Top 40 station in Eugene, Oregon, in the late 1970s. He is an avid Oregon Ducks football fan and often attends games at Autzen Stadium when given the opportunity. He is friends with baseball commentator Harold Reynolds.

Scott came out as gay in 2014, becoming the first active openly gay umpire in MLB. He is married to Michael Rausch, whom he met at CC Slaughters in Portland in October 1986.

In 2015, Scott was inducted into the National Gay and Lesbian Sports Hall of Fame, and to the Hall of Honor at Sheldon High School in his hometown of Eugene.

Scott released a book on May 1, 2022, "The Umpire Is Out: Calling the Game and Living My True Self" with Rob Neyer.

See also
 List of LGBT people from Portland, Oregon
 List of LGBT sportspeople
 List of Major League Baseball umpires

References

External links
Major league profile
Retrosheet

1959 births
Gay sportsmen
LGBT people from Oregon
American LGBT sportspeople
LGBT baseball players
Living people
Major League Baseball umpires
Sportspeople from Eugene, Oregon
American sportsmen
21st-century LGBT people